Carryy on Shekhar is an Indian talk show series hosted by television and film actor Shekhar Suman. The series premiered on 3 November 2003 on SAB TV.

References

Sony SAB original programming
Indian television talk shows
2003 Indian television series debuts